Spanish Fort is an unincorporated community in north central Montague County, Texas, United States at the end of Farm Road 103 one mile south of the Red River.

History
Native Americans long used the fertile areas near the Red River for farming and hunting.  Taovoyas took over an abandoned French garrison here around 1750 to defend against Spanish incursions in the area. In 1759, in the Battle of the Twin Villages, a Spanish army under Col. Diego Ortiz Parrilla attacked the Taovoyas' fortified position, but were defeated by a force of both the Taovoyas and Comanche tribes.  Anglo settlers later misnamed the area Spanish Fort after assuming that the Spanish forces had built a fortification there, rather than the French.

As the number of Native Americans in the region decreased by 1859, Anglo settlers started to move in. White settlement was encouraged across the newly formed Republic of Texas, and though Texas became a state in 1845, European settlers kept coming to Texas for farm land.  By the early 1870s, a town called Burlington had been established near present-day Spanish Fort.  The town was strategically located along the Chisholm Trail, and it became a popular cowboy town on the cattle drives from south and central Texas to Kansas.  Nearby Red River Station, Texas, was the last stop before entering Indian Territory and virtually all cattle driven along the Chisolm Trail crossed at Red River Station.  The town grew and citizens applied for a post office in 1876, but were rejected based on another Texas town of the same name.  Two local men suggested the misnomer "Spanish Fort" after the ruins nearby. The new name was accepted, and the Spanish Fort post office opened in 1877.

At its peak, the town had numerous businesses and churches, a Masonic lodge, five physicians, four hotels, and several saloons. Spanish Fort became known as a very rough and tumble cowboy town, and at least 40 murders are said to have occurred during the cattle drive heyday.

Herman Joseph Justin founded the boot company which later grew into Justin Industries. Justin took orders from the drivers going north and had their custom-made boots ready in time for them to pick up on their way back through.

But Spanish Fort would suffer, as many small Texas towns did, by being bypassed by the railroad.  When fencing and railroads put an end to the cattle drives, small towns not directly served by railways faltered.

The 20th century saw Spanish Fort almost completely vanish.  The post office, school, and newspapers all had closed by 1970.  Even the oil boom in Nocona's North Field could not save Spanish Fort, and the town has maintained a population of around 50 ever since.

Education
Spanish Fort is serviced by the Prairie Valley Independent School District.

Historical record
Spanish Fort received historic markers in 1936 and 1976 recognizing the Taovoya tribe culture and the 1759 confrontation with a Spanish expedition.

The Spanish Fort site was added to the National Register of Historic Places in 1975.

See also

National Register of Historic Places listings in Montague County, Texas

References

External links

Unincorporated communities in Montague County, Texas
Ghost towns in North Texas
Native American history of Texas
National Register of Historic Places in Montague County, Texas
Populated places on the National Register of Historic Places in Texas
Populated places established in 1750
1750 establishments in New Spain
Unincorporated communities in Texas